Elm Springs is a city in Benton and Washington Counties, Arkansas, United States. Located immediately west of Springdale in the Northwest Arkansas metropolitan statistical area, Elm Springs has been gaining population in recent years, including a 47% increase in population between the 2000 and 2010 censuses.

History
The first permanent settlement at Elm Springs was made in the 1840s. The town took its name from a large spring near the original town site.

Civil War
Elm Springs served as a gathering point for newly recruited confederate soldiers in 1861 prior to the Battle of Pea Ridge. By 1862, Elm Spring was a mustering site for confederate units from Arkansas and Missouri.  Two minor skirmishes were fought in Elm Springs on April 26, and July 30, 1863.

Geography
Elm Springs is located between the Boston Mountains and the Springfield Plateau within the Ozark Mountains. Initially a community surrounding a spring-fed mill, the community flourished even after the mill's destruction during the Civil War.

Demographics

2020 census

As of the 2020 United States census, there were 2,361 people, 819 households, and 702 families residing in the city.

2010 census
As of the census of 2010,  1,535 people, 527 households, and 439 families were residing in the city. The 577 housing units  averaged 108.7/sq mi (42.0/km2). The racial makeup of the city was 87.4% White, 1.2% African American, 1.4% Native American, 2.9% Asian, .2% from other races, and 1.4% from two or more races. About 8.5% of the population were Hispanics or Latinos of any race.

Of the 527 households, 37.2% had children under the age of 18 living with them, 71.9% were married couples living together, 6.5% had a female householder with no husband present, and 16.7% were not families. About 16.7% of all households were made up of individuals, and 4.7% had someone living alone who was 65 years of age or older. The average household size was 2.91, and the average family size was 3.21.

In the city, the age distribution was 26.7% under 18, 7.7% from 18 to 24, 24.2% from 25 to 44, 30.4% from 45 to 64, and 11.5% who were 65 or older.  The median age was 39.7 years. For every 100 females, there were 103.3 males.

In 2000, The median income for a household in the city was $40,703, and for a family was $45,536. Males had a median income of $30,550 versus $20,000 for females. The per capita income for the city was $17,551.  About 8.6% of families and 12.5% of the population were below the poverty line, including 19.8% of those under age 18 and 5.0% of those age 65 or over.

Education
All of Elm Springs is zoned to Springdale Public Schools.

In 2022 much of Elm Springs is zoned to Shaw Elementary School (areas north of 412), with some areas in the east zoned to Bernice Young Elementary School.  All of Elm Springs is zoned to Hellstern Middle School, Central Junior High School, and Har-Ber High School.

Elm Springs, in 2006, was divided between Hunt and Young elementary schools. All portions were zoned to Hellstern Middle School, Central Junior High School, and Har-Ber High.

Major highways
 Highway 112

Points of interest
Lake Elmdale, a popular fishing and bird-watching location, was built and is maintained by the Arkansas Game and Fish Commission.
Steele-Stevens Heritage Park is located around the city's namesake spring.

References

External links
 City of Elm Springs official website

Cities in Benton County, Arkansas
Cities in Washington County, Arkansas
Cities in Arkansas
Northwest Arkansas
Populated places established in 1917